Tom Keegan (born March 22, 1959) is an American sportswriter and author who is sports editor of the Chesterton Tribune, a twice-weekly newspaper in Chesterton, Ind. He was a columnist at the Boston Herald until getting laid off, July 1, 2020. He was at the Lawrence Journal-World in Lawrence, Kansas. While in Kansas, Keegan, members of his staff, and local TV personalities combined to do sports podcasts entitled "Spodcasters" on KUsports.com, one of the newspaper's four websites. Keegan also was one of four panelists on a weekly television show The Drive, which is broadcast during the college football and basketball seasons throughout Kansas and nationally on Fox College Sports.

Early years and education
Keegan was born in Rochester, New York, the seventh of ten children. He attended Bishop Kearney High School in Irondequoit, graduating in 1977. He then went on to Marquette University where he graduated with a B.A. in Journalism. Keegan married in Claremont, California in 1983. The couple has four children together.

Career
Prior to arriving in the Midwest, Keegan worked for ESPN radio AM-1050 in New York City, until being replaced by Stephen A. Smith. Before that he spent several years in newspapers, writing for the New York Post, The Baltimore Sun, Daily Southtown in Chicago, the now-defunct The National Sports Daily and the Orange County Register.

He is also well known for writing three baseball books, including Sleeper Cars and Flannel Uniforms on the late Elden Auker, a submarine-style pitcher who is known as the last living hurler to face Babe Ruth. He also wrote a book about Ernie Harwell and a story documenting the history of the first-base position.

Keegan's responsibilities in Lawrence included lead columnist, where he wrote several columns a week on the University of Kansas football and basketball teams.

References

External links
 Staff page at the Journal-World website

Living people
1959 births
American sportswriters
Marquette University alumni